"Pepe" is a 1960 song written by Hans Wittstatt and Dory Previn for the musical comedy film Pepe, featuring Mario Moreno ("Cantinflas") in the lead role. It was first recorded by Shirley Jones for the movie. Duane Eddy covered the song the same year. There have also been several other cover versions of this song.

Shirley Jones version
The song was originally performed in the movie by Shirley Jones. It was released as a single in 1960 on Colpix Records CP 15013. Jones' recording reached No. 4 in Spain.

Duane Eddy version

Duane Eddy covered the song in 1960 on Jamie Records 1175. His version charted at number 18 on the Billboard Hot 100. However, it was a much bigger hit in the United Kingdom, where it peaked at Number 2 in January 1961.

Charts

Other versions
Dalida covered it in French as "Pépé". It appeared on her 1961 album "Garde-moi la dernière danse" and one single from same year. It reached number 3 on the German chart, and number 10 on the Dutch chart. 
Jorgen Ingmann took a cover to number 6 in 1961 on the Norwegian Singles Chart.
In the UK, pianist Russ Conway took his cover version to number 19 in the British charts during January 1961.
Bert Weedon covered it in his 1976 compilation album 22 Golden Guitar Greats, which made him the first solo guitar player to top the UK Album Chart.

References

1960 songs
Shirley Jones songs
1960s instrumentals
Duane Eddy songs
Songs with lyrics by Dory Previn